Alonsa Wildlife Management Area is a wildlife management area located northwest of Alonsa, Manitoba, Canada. It was established in 1999 under the Manitoba Wildlife Act.

See also
 List of wildlife management areas in Manitoba
 List of protected areas of Manitoba

References

External links
 Alonsa Wildlife Management Area
 iNaturalist: Alonsa Wildlife Management Area

Protected areas established in 1999
Wildlife management areas of Manitoba
Protected areas of Manitoba
1999 establishments in Manitoba